Sharjeel Inam Memon, born 14 June 1974) is a Pakistani politician who was a Member of the Provincial Assembly of Sindh from June 2008 to May 2018.

Early life and education
He was born on 14 June 1974 in Hyderabad, Pakistan.

He earned the degree of Master of Arts in Economics from the University of Sindh and Bachelor of Engineering in Civil Technology from the Mehran University of Engineering and Technology.

Political career

He was elected to the Provincial Assembly of Sindh as a candidate for Pakistan Peoples Party (PPP) for PS-62 Tharparkar III in by-election held in June 2008. In March 2011, he was inducted into the Provincial Sindh cabinet of Chief Minister Syed Qaim Ali Shah and was made Provincial Minister of Sindh for information and archives where he continued to serve until resigning in November 2011. In June 2012, he rejoined the provincial cabinet and was re-appointed Minister of Sindh for information.

He was re-elected to the Provincial Assembly of Sindh as a candidate for PPP for PS-50 (Hyderabad-VI) in 2013 Pakistani general election. He was inducted into the Provincial Sindh cabinet of Chief Minister Syed Qaim Ali Shah and was made Provincial Minister of Sindh for information and archives. In a cabinet reshuffle in July 2015, he was made Provincial Minister of Sindh for local bodies with the additional portfolio of archives and works and services.

In December 2015, he was removed from the provincial cabinet while he was outside Pakistan. In October 2017, he was arrested by the National Accountability Bureau on corruption charges. In February 2018, he was indicted in the corruption case.

He was re-elected to Provincial Assembly of Sindh as a candidate of PPP from Constituency PS-63 (Hyderabad-II) in 2018 Pakistani general election.

Sharjeel Memon in September 2018 has presented before the Accountability Court Karachi in connection with the corruption case of 6 billion rupees, however, the hearing of the case was adjourned till September 26, 2018 due to the absence of National Accountability Bureau (NAB) prosecutor.
While talking to media outside the court Sharjeel Memon said that the recovery of alcohol bottles is my personal matter and the party has nothing to do with it.
СТI will give a reply before the inquiry committee in respect of inquiry running against me. No message of Bilawal Bhutto displeasure has been received by me.
An inquiry is underway in whatever happened in Ziauddin Hospital and I will give the reply in this regard before the inquiry committee, he added.
On responding to a query, that Bilawal Bhutto Zardari has expressed resentment in connection with the incident of Ziauddin Hospital , therefore, party leaders did not defend him in media Sharjeel Memon said that he did not get any message of the displeasure of Bilawal Bhutto Zardari.

References

Living people
Pakistan People's Party MPAs (Sindh)
1974 births
Sindh MPAs 2008–2013
Sindh MPAs 2013–2018
University of Sindh alumni
Mehran University of Engineering & Technology alumni
People from Hyderabad District, Pakistan
Pakistani prisoners and detainees
Pakistani politicians convicted of corruption
Sindh MPAs 2018–2023
Provincial ministers of Sindh
Memon people
Pakistanis named in the Pandora Papers